Red Barry is a 1938 13-chapter Universal movie serial based on the comic strip Red Barry by Will Gould.

Plot
An undercover police detective sets out to discover who stole $2 million in bonds.

Cast
 Buster Crabbe as Red Barry.  This was one of the few serial roles for Buster Crabbe in normal clothing.
 Edna Sedgewick as Natacha
 Frances Robinson as Mississippi
 Cyril Delevanti as Wing Fu
 Frank Lackteen as Quong Lee
 Wade Boteler as Inspector Scott
 Hugh Huntley as Harry Dycer, aka Valentine Vane
 Philip Ahn as Hong Kong Cholly
 William Ruhl as C.E. Mannix
 William Gould as Commissioner
 Wheeler Oakman as Weaver
 Stanley Price as Petrov
 Earl Douglas as Igor
 Charles Stevens as Captain Moy
 Eric Wilton as Tubbs, Vane's Butler

Chapter titles
Source:
 Millions for Defense
 The Curtain Falls
 The Decoy
 High Stakes
 Desperate Chances
 The Human Target
 Midnight Tragedy
 The Devil's Disguise
 Between Two Fires
 The False Trail
 Heavy Odds
 The Enemy Within
 Mission of Mercy

See also
 List of film serials
 List of film serials by studio

References

Notes

Sources consulted 
 
 Mayer, Geoff. Encyclopaedia of American Film Serials (McFarland, 2017)

External links
 
 

1938 films
American black-and-white films
American detective films
1930s English-language films
Films based on comic strips
Universal Pictures film serials
Films directed by Ford Beebe
Films directed by Alan James
1938 mystery films
American mystery films
1930s American films